Irządze may refer to the following places in Poland:
Irządze, Lower Silesian Voivodeship (south-west Poland)
Irządze, Silesian Voivodeship (south Poland)